Shaunti Feldhahn is the author of books such as For Women Only and For Men Only, which have sold more than 2 million copies in 23 languages worldwide since 1998.

References

External links
 Homepage

American self-help writers
American Christian writers
College of William & Mary alumni
Harvard Kennedy School alumni
Living people
Year of birth missing (living people)
Place of birth missing (living people)